Adrien Alexandre Adolphe de Carrey de Bellemare, more commonly known as Carey de Bellemare was a French Divisional General who was most notable for his service during the Franco-Prussian War.

Biography

Early Military Career
Bellemare entered the École spéciale militaire de Saint-Cyr on April 16, 1841, who was made a sub-lieutenant on April 1, 1843 and then assigned to a Zouave regiment in the French conquest of Algeria. On June 19, 1845, during the fighting there with the nomadic tribe of the Ouled el-Act, he was shot and had to return home. On May 30, 1848 he was ordinance officer of General Lamoriciere and participated in June in the fight against the June Days uprising, where he was wounded again on June 23 while cracking down on the barricade of Faubourg Saint-Martin.On June 28, 1848 he was knighted in the Legion of Honor. After being promoted to lieutenant, he was assigned to the 48th Infantry Regiment on July 28, 1848. He was then promoted to captain on July 5, 1854 and took part in the Åland War and the Battle of Bomarsund from July 15 under General Baraguey d'Hilliers.

Transferred to the 74th Infantry Regiment on January 31, 1856, he took part in the Crimean War on February 29 and June 19. His appointment as battalion commander in the 81st Infantry Regiment took place on May 17, 1859. From April 27th he took part in the Italian campaign and led a battalion in the 98th Infantry Regiment, then the 3rd Regiment of the Guard Corps. On July 2, 1859, he returned to France and on May 12, he was appointed officer of the Legion of Honor. On July 28, 1862, he went to Mexico with the French expeditionary force. He participated in the Battle of Puebla and distinguished himself in the storming of Fort San Xavier. Back in France, he was promoted to lieutenant colonel on June 15, 1863 and assigned to the 95th Infantry Regiment on August 13. On August 21, he moved to the 17th regiment as commander and on October 7, 1863 to the 97th Infantry Regiment.

Franco-Prussian War
On August 10, 1868 he was promoted to colonel and, with the outbreak of the Franco-Prussian War, took command of the 78th Line Regiment that was used in the Battle of Wörth. On August 25, 1870 he was appointed Brigadier General and took over the command of the 2nd Brigade of the 4th Division (1st Corps of the Chalons Army). During the Battle of Beaumont , after General Lartigue was wounded, he took command of the 4th Division and escaped while disguised as a farmer after the Battle of Sedan from captivity. He returned to Paris on September 8th, after the fall of the French Empire, he took command of the northern fortification front in the Saint-Denis area. For the organization of Fort Briche he was commended by General Ducrot . On October 27th and 28th, he led a brigade on the offensive in the Le Bourget area. On November 3, he led a new brigade in the 1st Division of III. Corps with which he led a sortie to the Marne on November 30th at the Battle of Villiers. also deals heavy damage to the enemy. On December 5, he took over the leadership of the 1st Division of the II. Corps and was promoted to Division General on December 8, 1870. On January 19, 1871, he led during the Battle of Buzenval in the middle column with 34,680 men in the battle of Mont Valérien, while General Vinoy attacked a column against Saint-Cloud and General Ducrot against Rueil-Malmaison. On February 16, 1871, he was relieved of command against his will and placed in reserve.

Postwar Life
On August 22, 1873 he was briefly assigned to a brigade of the 14th Military Division in Périgueux and was dismissed on October 28 after publishing a letter in which he states that he refused to serve a monarchy. On June 16, 1874, he entered service again with the rank of brigadier general, on April 13, 1874, he was given command of the 55th Infantry Brigade. On May 14, 1875, he took over the 60th Brigade, on January 12, 1876, the 69th Brigade and on September 19, 1877, the 2nd Brigade. The fall of President Mac-Mahon and the rise of the Republicans to power accelerated his further career. On June 3, 1879, he was appointed commander of the 29th Infantry Division in Nice and was promoted to Major General in 1879. On July 8, 1881, he became commander of the Legion of Honor. Between 1879 and 1882 he was Inspector General of the 29th Military Arrondissement. On February 27, 1883 he was Commanding General of the XIII. Corps in Clermont-Ferrand , on February 15, 1885 he took over the V Corps in Orléans and on February 6, 1886 the IX. Corps in Tours. He was appointed a member of the War Council on February 6, 1886, and was appointed Grand Officer of the Legion of Honor on June 24. Because of a special mission abroad he had to take command of the IX on June 28, 1888. And retired on December 14, 1889. Bellemare died in September 13, 1905 in Nice.

References

External links
 Biography at Ecole superieure de guerre
 General Carrey de Bellemare

1824 births
1905 deaths
French military personnel of the Franco-Prussian War
French generals
French military personnel of the Crimean War
Grand Officiers of the Légion d'honneur
People of the Second Italian War of Independence
French military personnel of the Second French intervention in Mexico